The 1973 Stockholm Open was a tennis tournament played on hard courts and part of the 1973 Commercial Union Assurance Grand Prix and took place at the Kungliga tennishallen in Stockholm, Sweden. The tournament was held from 5 November through 11 November 1973. Total prize money for the event was $75,000, with the winner receiving $10,000, and a record 24,000 spectators attended the tournament.

Finals

Singles

 Tom Gorman defeated  Björn Borg, 6–3, 4–6, 7–6(7–5)

Doubles

 Jimmy Connors /  Ilie Năstase defeated  Bob Carmichael /  Frew McMillan 6–3, 6–7, 6–2

References

External links
  
 ATP tournament profile
 ITF tournament edition details

Stockholm Open
Stockholm Open
Stock
November 1973 sports events in Europe
1970s in Stockholm